Kodikal is a locality in Mangalore city, Karnataka, India.

Localities in Mangalore